Westcliff High School for Boys (WHSB) is an 11–18 selective academy grammar school for boys in Westcliff-on-Sea, Essex, England. In September 2001 the school was awarded ‘Beacon’ status for its breadth of achievements and quality of work. The school was classed as a humanities college in early 2007 and received a further specialism in science, technology, engineering and mathematics (STEM) on 1 April 2009. The school converted to academy status in 2010.

Headmasters 
 1920 - 1942, Herbert Glynne Williams
 1943 - 1946, Eric Ayres
 1947 - 1970, Henry Cloke 
 1970 - 1990, Peter Clarke
 1990 - 2012, Andrew Baker
 2012–present, Michael Skelly

Notable Old Westcliffians 

 Maajid Nawaz, activist and former radio presenter
 Alf Adams, professor of physics at the University of Surrey from 1987 to 2008
 Peter Bone, Conservative MP for Wellingborough
 Ian James Brackley, Bishop of Dorking 1996-
 Gary Brooker, lead singer of the band Procol Harum
 Chris Clarke, leader of Somerset County Council from 1993 to 2000
 Alan Cook, physicist
 Geoffrey Crawley, photographic expert and journalist, and exposer of the Cottingley Fairies hoax
 Edward Greenfield, music critic working for The Guardian from 1977 to 1993
 Benjamin Grosvenor, musician
 Neil Harman, chief tennis correspondent, The Times
 Joshua Hayward, musician
 Alan Hurst, former Labour MP for Braintree (1997–2005)
 Jon Hutton, former Labour cabinet minister, now a life peer
 Stuart Jack, Governor of the Cayman Islands from 2005 to 2009
 Wilko Johnson, rock musician, guitarist/vocalist, and songwriter, for Dr. Feelgood
 Nigel Maddox, station commander of RAF Bruggen from 1996 to 1999
 David Nixon, magician
 James O'Donnell, organist and choirmaster of Westminster Abbey 2000-2022
 Julian Parkhill, professor at the University of Cambridge
 Bob Parr, Emmy Award-winning television producer, MBE, Doctor of Philosophy and Associate of King’s College London (AKC) 
 Jamie Reeves, two-time FA Vase winning semi-professional footballer and football pundit
 Eric Sams, musicologist and Shakespeare scholar 
 Derek Wyatt, Labour Member of Parliament for Sittingbourne and Sheppey 1997–2010. Played rugby union for Oxford University and England

References

External links 
 
UK Government Establishment Details

Boys' schools in Essex
Grammar schools in Southend-on-Sea
Academies in Southend-on-Sea
Educational institutions established in 1920
1920 establishments in England